Denise Williamson is an American actress best known for her work on Maggie (2015), Blacktino (2011) and The D Train (2015).

Filmography

References

External links 

 

Living people
American film actresses
Place of birth missing (living people)
Sam Houston State University alumni
21st-century American women
1983 births